Phenylephrine is a selective α1 receptor agonist medication primarily used as a nasal decongestant, to dilate the pupil, to increase blood pressure, and to relieve hemorrhoids. Phenylephrine can be taken by mouth, as a nasal spray, given by injection into a vein or muscle, or applied to the skin.

Common side effects when taken by mouth or injected include nausea, vomiting, headache, and anxiety. Use on hemorrhoids is generally well tolerated. Severe side effects may include a slow heart rate, intestinal ischemia, chest pain, kidney failure, and tissue death at the site of injection. It is unclear if use during pregnancy or breastfeeding is safe. Phenylephrine is a selective α1-adrenergic receptor agonist which results in the constriction of both arteries and veins.

Phenylephrine was patented in 1927 and came into medical use in 1938. It is available as a generic medication. Unlike pseudoephedrine, abuse of phenylephrine is very uncommon.

Its effectiveness as a nasal decongestant has been questioned.

Medical uses

Decongestant 
Phenylephrine is used as a decongestant sold as an oral medicine or as a nasal spray. It is a common ingredient in over-the-counter decongestants in the United States.

Phenylephrine is used as an alternative to pseudoephedrine as a decongestant, whose availability has been restricted due to a potential for use in the illicit synthesis of methamphetamine. Its efficacy as an oral decongestant has been questioned, with several independent studies finding that it provided no more relief to sinus congestion than a placebo.

A 2007 meta-analysis concluded that the evidence for its effectiveness is insufficient, though another meta-analysis published shortly thereafter by researchers from GlaxoSmithKline found the standard 10-mg dose to be more effective than a placebo; however, the fact that GSK markets many products containing phenylephrine has raised some speculation regarding selective publishing and other controversial techniques. A 2007 study by Wyeth Consumer Healthcare notes that 7 studies available in 1976 support the efficacy of phenylephrine at a 10 mg dosage. The Food and Drug Administration withdrew the indication "for the temporary relief of nasal congestion associated with sinusitis" in 2007.

Two studies published in 2009, examined the effects of phenylephrine on symptoms of allergic rhinitis by exposing people to pollen in a controlled, indoor environment. Neither study was able to distinguish between the effects of phenylephrine or a placebo. Pseudoephedrine and loratadine–montelukast therapy were found to be significantly more effective than both phenylephrine and placebo.

Pseudoephedrine was previously much more commonly available in the United States, however, provisions of the Combat Methamphetamine Epidemic Act of 2005 placed restrictions on the sale of pseudoephedrine products to prevent the clandestine manufacture of methamphetamine. Since 2004, phenylephrine has been increasingly marketed as a substitute for pseudoephedrine; some manufacturers have changed the active ingredients of products to avoid the restrictions on sales. Phenylephrine has been off patent for some time, and many generic brands are available.

Hemorrhoids 
Hemorrhoids are caused by swollen veins in the rectal area. Phenylephrine can be used topically to prevent symptoms of hemorrhoids. Phenylephrine causes the constriction of vascular smooth muscle and is often used in the treatment of hemorrhoids presumably to narrow the swollen veins and relieve the attendant pain. However, veins—unlike arteries—contain less vascular smooth muscle in their walls so the mechanism by which pain relief is achieved is likely related to something other than vascular change alone. Products for treatment may also include substances that will form a protective barrier over the inflamed area, resulting in less pain when feces are passed.

Pupil dilation 

Phenylephrine is used as an eye drop to dilate the pupil to facilitate visualization of the retina. It is often used in combination with tropicamide as a synergist when tropicamide alone is not sufficient. Narrow-angle glaucoma is a contraindication to phenylephrine use. As a mydriatic, it is available in 2.5% and 10% minims. Phenylephrine eye drops are applied to the eye after a topical anesthetic is applied.

Intraocular bleeding 
Phenylephrine has been used as an intracameral injection into the anterior chamber of the eye to arrest intraocular bleeding occurring during cataract and glaucoma surgery.

Vasopressor 
Phenylephrine is commonly used as a vasopressor to increase the blood pressure in unstable patients with hypotension, especially resulting from septic shock. Such use is common in anesthesia or critical-care practices; it is especially useful in counteracting the hypotensive effect of epidural and subarachnoid anesthetics, as well as the vasodilating effect of bacterial toxins and the inflammatory response in sepsis and systemic inflammatory response syndrome. The elimination half life of phenylephrine is about 2.5 to 3.0 hours. The clinical effects of a single intravenous bolus dose of phenylephrine are short lived and needs to be repeated every 10–15 minutes. Commonly the drug is given as a carefully titrated intravenous infusion with a syringe pump or volumetric pump.

Because of its vasoconstrictive effect, phenylephrine can cause severe necrosis if it infiltrates the surrounding tissues. Because of this, it should be given through a central line if at all possible. Damage may be prevented or mitigated by infiltrating the tissue with the alpha blocker phentolamine by subcutaneous injection.

Phenylephrine hydrochloride at 0.25% is used as a vasoconstrictor in some suppository formulations.

Recently, Phenylephrine has been used to treat conditions of orthostatic intolerance such as postural orthostatic tachycardia syndrome - where by activation of venous alpha 1 adrenoreceptors increases venous return and stroke volume which improves symptoms.

Priapism 
Phenylephrine is used to treat priapism. It is diluted with normal saline and injected directly into the corpora cavernosa. The mechanism of action is to cause constriction of the blood vessels entering into the penis, thus causing decreased blood flow and relieving the priapism. An injection is given every 3–5 minutes. If priapism is not resolved in one hour, another form of therapy is considered.

Side effects 
Phenylephrine may cause side effects such as headache, reflex bradycardia, excitability, restlessness and cardiac arrhythmias. Phenylephrine is not suggested for use in people with hypertension.

Heart 
The primary side effect of phenylephrine is high blood pressure. People with high blood pressure are typically advised to avoid products containing it. Because this medication is a sympathomimetic amine without beta-adrenergic activity, it does not increase contractility force and output of the cardiac muscle. It may increase blood pressure resulting in a slow heart rate through stimulation of vascular (likely carotid) baroreceptors. A common side effect during IV administration is reflex bradycardia. The low concentration eye drops do not cause blood pressure changes and the changes with the higher dose drops do not last long.

Other
Prostatic hyperplasia can also be worsened by use, and chronic use can lead to rebound hyperemia. People with a history of anxiety or panic disorders, or on anticonvulsant medication for epilepsy should not take this substance. The drug interaction might produce seizures. Some patients have been shown to have an upset stomach, severe abdominal cramping, and vomiting issues connected to taking this drug.

Phenylephrine is pregnancy category C. Due to the lack of studies done in animals and in humans, it is not known whether there is harm to the fetus. Phenylephrine should only be given to pregnant women who have a clear need.

Extended use may cause rhinitis medicamentosa, a condition of rebound nasal congestion.

Interactions 
The increase in blood pressure effect of phenylephrine may be increased by drugs such as monoamine oxidase inhibitors, tricyclic antidepressants, and hydrocortisone. Patients taking these medications may need a lower dose of phenylephrine to achieve a similar increase in blood pressure.

Drugs that may decrease the effects of phenylephrine may include calcium channel blockers, ACE inhibitors and benzodiazepines. Patients taking these medications may need a higher dose of phenylephrine to achieve a comparable increase in blood pressure.

Pharmacology

Pharmacodynamics 
Phenylephrine is a sympathomimetic drug, which means that it mimics the actions of epinephrine (commonly known as adrenaline) or norepinephrine. Phenylephrine selectively binds to alpha-1 receptors which causes venous and arterial vasoconstriction.

Whereas pseudoephedrine causes both vasoconstriction and increase of mucociliary clearance through its nonspecific adrenergic activity, phenylephrine's selective α-adrenergic agonism causes vasoconstriction alone, creating a difference in their methods of action.

Pharmacokinetics 
Oral phenylephrine is extensively metabolized by monoamine oxidase, an enzyme that is present on the mitochondrial membrane of cells throughout the body. Compared to intravenous pseudoephedrine, phenylephrine has a reduced and variable bioavailability; only up to 38%.

References

External links 
 

Alpha-1 adrenergic receptor agonists
Amines
Cardiac stimulants
Phenylethanolamines
Phenols
Rhinology
Topical decongestants
Vasoconstrictors
Wikipedia medicine articles ready to translate